Jiāo (焦) is a Chinese surnames. Its Wade-Giles romanization and Cantonese pronunciation are Chiao.

Notable people
 Jiao Yu, military officer of Ming Dynasty
 Jiao Li, President of China Central Television
 Leroy Chiao, Chinese-American engineer, former NASA astronaut
 Jiao Huafeng, Greco-Roman wrestler
 Jiao Fengbo, footballer
 Jiao Shuai, volleyball player
 Jiao Zhimin, former table tennis player
 Jiao Juyin, director, translator, and theater theorist
 Jiao Liuyang, swimmer
 Vincent Chiao, actor
 Jiao Ting, a character in the Water Margin

See also

Chiao (disambiguation)

Chinese-language surnames
Individual Chinese surnames